Mcclungia is a genus of clearwing (ithomiine) butterflies, named by Fox in 1940. They are in the brush-footed butterfly family, Nymphalidae. The genus is monotypic, containing only Mcclungia cymo named by Jacob Hübner in 1806.

References 

Ithomiini
Nymphalidae of South America
Nymphalidae genera
Monotypic butterfly genera